Pseudaclytia bambusana is a moth in the subfamily Arctiinae. It was described by Schaus in 1938. It is found on Cuba.

References

Natural History Museum Lepidoptera generic names catalog

Moths described in 1938
Arctiinae
Endemic fauna of Cuba